Tejashwi Prasad Yadav (born 9 November 1989) is an Indian politician, former professional cricketer, and the current Deputy Chief Minister of Bihar, in office since August 2022. He also serves as the Minister of Health, Minister of Road Construction and Public Works Department, Minister of Urban Development and Housing as well as the Minister of Rural Works and Development and in the Bihar Government. Yadav leads the Rashtriya Janata Dal, the single largest political party in the state, and is the chairperson of the Mahagathbandhan alliance, the ruling coalition currently in Government.

As a professional cricketer, he was in the Delhi Daredevils and the Jharkhand cricket team. In 2015, he was elected as the representative of the Raghopur constituency and served as the Deputy Chief Minister of Bihar between 2015 and 2017. Following which he served as the leader of opposition in the Bihar Legislative Assembly from 2017 to 2022. He is noted to have been both the youngest Deputy Chief Minister of Bihar and the youngest leader of opposition in India during the respective periods. Yadav was featured in the Indian Express ‘100 Most Powerful Indians’ in 2020 and 2021.

Early life and education  

Tejashwi Yadav was born in Gopalganj, Bihar on 9 November 1989 to Rabri Devi and Lalu Prasad Yadav, both of whom were members of the Bihar Legislative Assembly and later became the Chief Ministers of Bihar. He is one of 9 siblings (7 sisters and 2 brothers) among whom he is the youngest. He began his schooling in Patna and later moved to Delhi, accompanying his eldest sister Misa Bharti who was enrolled for an MBBS. In Delhi, Yadav initially attended Delhi Public School in Vasant Vihar for primary classes till Class V.actually he is 9th fail.

Family

His 7 sisters are Misa Bharti, Rohini, Chanda, Ragini, Hema, Anushka and Raj Lakshmi Yadav. Tej Pratap Yadav is his elder brother. 

Anushka Yadav is married to Chiranjeev Rao, while Raj Lakshmi Yadav is married to Tej Pratap Singh Yadav.

Personal life
On 9 December 2021, Tejashwi Yadav married his long-time friend Rajshree Yadav.  She is from Rewari in Haryana and has been living in Delhi since childhood. Rajshree and Tejashwi studied together at DPS school in RK Puram, New Delhi.

Youth sports
According to his school teachers, he was a scrawny and shy child. He was also the school cricket team's captain. From Class VI onwards, he began attending Delhi Public School, R. K. Puram. The principal of the school described him as an introvert and a cricket enthusiast. He played in the school's cricket team and was selected for the U-15 cricket team of Delhi as an all rounder at the age of 13.  According to his teammates, he had helped them win a number of tournaments during his first season, his team also included Virat Kohli as its captain. The U-15 team won the national championship where Yadav had a match winning partnership with Ishant Sharma in the finals. He dropped out of his school in Class X to pursue a sports career, and was eventually got into U-17 and U-19 cricket team of Delhi. Tejashwi was also selected in the list of standby players for the world cup winning U-19 Indian national cricket team, later in the same year.

Cricket career 
Yadav was contracted by the Delhi Daredevils for the 2008 Indian Premier League franchise. He remained in the reserve bench of the team in the entire seasons between 2008 and 2012.

He was also selected for the state level Jharkhand cricket team in 2009. His professional cricket debut began with 4 Twenty20 matches primarily in the capacity of a bowler in the Syed Mushtaq Ali Trophy. Following which he was called for a first class game against  Vidarbha cricket team at Dhanbad. He was fielded as the number 7 batsman and bowled in 5 overs. In 2010, he made his one-day debut in the Vijay Hazare Trophy and played two matches against Odisha cricket team and the Tripura cricket team respectively; his team lost the first match and won the second one, Yadav took a wicket against Tripura.

By 2013, Yadav had retired from his cricket career. According to a 2013 article of the Business Standard, "the stupefying talent soon gave way to a spate of middling performances, ensuring that his cricketing career never fully took off." According to his team coaches, he had the potential for success in his cricket career but was let down by the lack of adequate facilities for sportsmen in Bihar; the state also lacked a domestic cricket team which had caused Yadav to move to another state like most other Bihari players where local players were prioritised for playing matches.

Political career 

Since 2010, while still pursuing his cricket career, Yadav had begun campaigning for the Rashtriya Janata Dal. Following his advent into politics, he was credited for successfully modernising campaigning strategies and initiating digital outreach for the party. According to Rashtriya Janata Dal insiders, Yadav had also convinced Lalu Prasad to form a coalition with Nitish Kumar and his Janata Dal (United) following the poor performance of both the parties in the 2014 Indian general election in Bihar. Eventually an alliance was formed between the Janata Dal (United), Rashtriya Janata Dal and the Indian National Congress.

In the 2015 Bihar Legislative Assembly election, Yadav stood as the candidate of the Mahagathbandan (Grand Alliance) from both the Raghopur was elected as the representative of the constituency. The election also resulted in an overwhelming majority for the alliance in the assembly, which led to Yadav being appointed as the Deputy Chief Minister of Bihar and received the portfolios of public works, forestry and environment in the 5th Nitish Kumar cabinet.

In 2017, the Central Bureau of Investigation (CBI) filed a case and the Enforcement Directorate (ED) launched a probe in relation to money laundering in a 2004 corruption case involving the Indian Railway Catering and Tourism Corporation, against Yadav and other members of his family including his parents Rabri Devi and Lalu Prasad Yadav. This caused Nitish Kumar to pull the Janata Dal (United), out of the alliance and form a new government along with the Bharatiya Janata Party. Subsequently, Yadav became the leader of opposition owing to the Rashtriya Janata Dal being the largest party in the state legislature. In response to the case lodged against him, Yadav accused the Bharatiya Janata Party of abusing government machinery to carry out political schemes. In 2018, he was granted relief in the case by the Delhi High Court after he maintaining that he could not have played a role as the allegation was leveled on him at a time when he was only 14 years old.

By March 2018, Yadav had become the de facto leader of the Rashtriya Janata Dal. Upon appointment, he issued an official apology addressing the people of Bihar for "lapses and mistakes" that may have been committed by the party during its tenure in the state government and that he himself was unaware of them being too young at the time. During his term as the leader of opposition, Yadav later became involved in organising food relief in the aftermath of the 2019 Bihar floods.

Yadav led the Rashtriya Janata Dal in the 2020 Bihar Legislative Assembly elections, as the Chief Ministerial candidate of the Mahagathbandhan. The alliance won 110 seats in total out of 243, with RJD winning 75 seats, continuing to remain the single largest political party in Bihar. Since the majority required was 122, the alliance was unable to form the government, and Yadav was elected as the Leader of Opposition of Bihar.

On 10 August 2022, he took oath as the Deputy Chief Minister of Bihar with Nitish Kumar taking oath as Chief Minister as part of the Mahagathbandan formed with RJD, Congress and other Opposition Parties.

Controversies

In 2008, Yadav became the subject of new reports following an altercation where he and his brother Tej Pratap Yadav were allegedly assaulted at a traffic stop by a group in a neighbouring car and were hospitalised for bruises as a result; in the aftermath the Railway Protection Force (RPF) personnel accompanying the two lodged a complaint to register the loss of weaponry. The group alleged that the two had harassed some girls while according to the RPF personnel, the group including both boys and girls had abused and assaulted the brothers and one of the RPF constables which led to the loss of his service revolver.

See also

Lalu Prasad Yadav
Rabri Devi
Rashtriya Janata Dal
List of politicians from Bihar

References

External links

 

1989 births
Deputy Chief Ministers of Bihar
Leaders of the Opposition in the Bihar Legislative Assembly
Delhi Capitals cricketers
Living people
Jharkhand cricketers
Rashtriya Janata Dal politicians
Politicians from Patna
Bihar MLAs 2015–2020
Tejashvi
Cricketers from Patna
Bihar MLAs 2020–2025